The Time We Have Taken is a 2007 novel by Australian author Steven Carroll. It is the third in a sequence of novels, following The Art of the Engine Driver and The Gift of Speed, which follow the development of an outer Melbourne suburb from the 1950s to the 1970s. The novels have been described as a 'slow-moving, Proustian meditation on being and time' and 'a deeply satisfying encounter with the empty spaces that the suburb failed to fill both between people and inside them.'

Awards

Commonwealth Writers Prize, South East Asia and South Pacific Region, Best Book, 2008: winner 
Miles Franklin Literary Award, 2008: winner 
Victorian Premier's Literary Award, The Vance Palmer Prize for Fiction, 2007: shortlisted 
The Age Book of the Year Award, Fiction Prize, 2007: shortlisted

Reviews
"The Advertiser"
"The Age"
Readings

References

2007 Interview with author

2007 Australian novels
Miles Franklin Award-winning works
Novels set in Melbourne
HarperCollins books